James Beaty (2 October 1798 – 5 March 1892) was a Member of Canada's Parliament from 1867 to 1874, and published the Toronto Leader newspaper.

Beaty was born in Killeshandra, County Cavan, Ireland, emigrating to Canada in 1818. He married Sarah Ann Armstrong (1799–1829) on 26 December 1822. He never remarried after her death.

He was elected to the 1st Canadian Parliament on 20 September 1867 under the Conservative Party. He was re-elected in 1872 for the 2nd Canadian Parliament, his final term in federal politics.

A member of the Disciples of Christ Christian denomination, he was active in establishing new congregations.

In 1852, Beaty established the Toronto Leader newspaper. He would also be active in other businesses.

Beatty positioned himself as a champion of unions, when the typographers of Toronto went on strike in 1872. This put him in direct opposition to George Brown and the Globe newspaper.

He was sometimes referred to as James Beaty, Sen. (senior). A nephew of the same name, James Beaty (1831-1899), would also serve as a Member of Parliament from 1880 to 1887.

Beaty died in Toronto (Parkdale). His funeral was conducted at his residence on Fuller Street.

References
 
 Island Register: "The Descendants of Robert Beaty and Catherine Crawford"

External links 
 
 

1798 births
1892 deaths
Conservative Party of Canada (1867–1942) MPs
Canadian people of Ulster-Scottish descent
Members of the House of Commons of Canada from Ontario
Canadian Disciples of Christ
People from County Cavan
Irish emigrants to pre-Confederation Ontario
Immigrants to Upper Canada